The Seattle Seahawks Ring of Honor is a group of people honored for their contributions to the Seattle Seahawks, a professional football team in the National Football League.

References

Ring
American football museums and halls of fame
Halls of fame in Washington (state)
Awards established in 1989